Cecil Dick, or Degadoga (1915–1992) was a well-known Cherokee artist often referred to  as "the Father of Cherokee Traditional Art".

Biography 
Cecil, born near Rose Prairie, Oklahoma, was one of the pioneers of 20th-century, flat-style painting among Eastern Woodland tribes in Oklahoma. He was part of the Cherokee Nation and the United Keetoowah Band of Cherokee Indians. During childhood, he spoke only the Cherokee language. He became an orphan when he was 12 years old, and was raised in Indian boarding schools. He attended "The Studio" at the Santa Fe Indian School and Bacone College.

Dick did not paint on a regular schedule, but only when he felt like doing so. He regularly worked as a draftsman and as a sign painter to support himself. Hence his art work is relatively rare. He also became known as an authority on Cherokee mythology and the written Cherokee language.

Cecil Dick became the first Native American to win the Oklahoma Artists Exhibition at Philbrook Museum of Art in Tulsa. In 1983 Cecil was honored for his intellectual and artistic achievements with the Sequoyah Medal by the Cherokee Nation. The Cherokee Heritage Association held a 50-year retrospective exhibition of his lifetime work that same year. In 1991, the Five Civilized Tribes Museum in Muskogee, Oklahoma named the "Cecil Dick Master of Heritage Award" in his honor. This award is given out during its annual Competitive Art Show to recognize outstanding paintings in the flat-style.

His obituary stated that some of his paintings were in the Smithsonian Institution in Washington, D. C., the Heard Museum in Phoenix, Tulsa's Gilcrease Museum and the Five Civilized Tribes Museum in Muskogee.

Death and legacy 
Cecil died in 1992 in Tahlequah, Oklahoma, (respectful correction: He died at a Tulsa Hospital but lived in Tahlequah) having spent over 50 years recording Cherokee culture and history in his art.

In 1996, a group of Talequah physicians donated an original Dick acrylic mural to the Cherokee Nation. One of the physicians, Ed Painter, had commissioned the work in 1960, and hung it in the Tahlequah Medical Center. Titled "The Curing of the Fever," it portrays Cherokee healing practices before the initial contact with white men.

Native American art experts reportedly appraised the auction value of the mural in the range of $65,000 to $100,000.

Notes

See also
List of Native American artists
Visual arts by indigenous peoples of the Americas

References

Further reading
 
 

Cherokee artists
Native American painters
Painters from Oklahoma
People from Tahlequah, Oklahoma
1915 births
1992 deaths
20th-century American painters
American male painters
Cherokee Nation artists
United Keetoowah Band people
Bacone College alumni
Native American male artists
20th-century Native Americans
20th-century American male artists